London College of Music (LCM) is a music school in London, England. It is one of eight separate schools that make up the University of West London.

History 
LCM was founded in 1887 and existed as an independent music conservatoire based at Great Marlborough Street in central London until 1991. The college then moved to Ealing and became part of the Polytechnic of West London (which became Thames Valley University and was renamed the University of West London in 2011).

In 1996 Thames Valley University created a School entitled London College of Music & Media, which encompassed LCM and a range of media-related subjects such as music technology, radio, journalism and other creative and digital arts. In 2005 LCMM was renamed the Faculty of the Arts, with music-related subjects administered by the Department of Music. Since March 2007 the music department has been operating once again under the title of London College of Music.

Former principals of London College of Music include William Lloyd Webber (the father of  English composer and impresario of musical theatre Andrew Lloyd Webber and British cellist, conductor and music educator Julian Lloyd Webber), composer and pianist John McCabe and Professor Colin Lawson (who took up the posts of Dean of LCM and Pro Vice Chancellor of the University at Ealing in 2002, continuing there until his appointment as Director of the Royal College of Music in Kensington in 2005). LCM's Chair of Composition and Head of Research is Francis Pott, widely known in particular as a composer of sacred choral music and works for the organ. His works have been performed in some forty countries worldwide.

Past visiting professors at LCM have included Guy Woolfenden, Nick Ingman and (following his retirement from the role of Principal) John McCabe. A long-running and successful programme of weekly "Composers' Workshops" has included guest presentations by (among others) Stephen Montague, Jonathan Dove, Judith Weir, David Sawer, Judith Bingham, Deirdre Gribbin, Augusta Read Thomas, Param Vir, Philip Grange, Jonty Harrison, Camden Reeves, Nigel Hess, Francis Pott, Andrew Poppy, Simon Holt, John Cameron, Michael Finnissy, the late Geoffrey Burgon and the late David Bedford. Piano master classes have been presented by Martino Tirimo, John Lill, Howard Shelley and several other distinguished artists.

Academics 
The external examinations department of London College of Music, known as London College of Music Examinations (LCM Examinations), is a department of the University, affiliated to LCM itself.

The music technology department of LCM incorporates 25 recording studios, plus the Native Instruments Labs. As well as offering music technology courses at undergraduate and postgraduate level, LCM is an official Native Instruments training centre and offers Apple certified Logic, Pro Tools and Ableton Live training courses. The music technology teaching staff includes Grammy Award winning record producer Pip Williams, Journal on the Art of Record Production editor Dr Simon Zagorski-Thomas, producer Paul Borg, and long-time Transglobal Underground collaborator Larry Whelan. LCM also has a Reader in Music, the Messiaen scholar and organist Dr Robert Sholl. Over the past twenty years its composition staff has included John McLeod, Martin Ellerby, Nigel Clarke, Dr Laurence Roman, Dr Paul Robinson, Dr Jeremy Arden, the Oscar-nominated film composer Simon Lambros and the current Course Leader for undergraduate Composition within the BMus degree, Dr Martin Glover.

Notable alumni 

Bill Bailey (comedian and musician, received an Associate Diploma)
Alex da Kid (English record production/songwriter, now based in LA) 
Robert Orton (audio engineer) (worked with Trevor Horn, The Police and won two Grammys for mixing Lady Gaga) 
Ben Salter (who worked with Nile Rodgers in the United States) 
Matt Tong of Bloc Party
Richard Wright (Pink Floyd keyboardist)

Arms

See also
 Armorial of UK universities
 List of universities in the UK

References

 website
 LCM Examinations website
 University of West London website

Music schools in London
Drama schools in London
Performing arts education in London
Educational institutions established in 1887
1887 establishments in England